Guardiola rosei is a rare North American species of plants in the family Asteraceae. It is found only in northern Mexico in the states of Chihuahua, Durango, and Nayarit.

References

External links
Photo of herbarium specimen at Missouri Botanical Garden, collected in Durango in 1906

rosei
Flora of Mexico
Plants described in 1899